Darlington Dam, also referred to as Lake Mentz. is a gravity type dam situated in the Sundays River, near Kirkwood, in Eastern Cape, South Africa. It was completed in 1922 and only filled by 1928, the delay a result of extensive drought. 

The primary objective of building the dam was to provide adequate and perennial supplies of water for large-scale irrigation in a fertile area, particularly by storing and controlling flood waters. By 1917, the Sundays River Irrigation Board was established and took over the project from the government's Irrigation Department in 1918. The construction experienced many setbacks, including lack of materials and machinery, with shortages caused by the First World War, unsuitable labour (returning soldiers), the 1918 influenza epidemic, bubonic plague, very difficult logistics and drought. The delays in completion caused severe financial difficulties to the irrigation companies and eventually the State had to take over the debts of the irrigators and £2,350,000 had to be written off. 

The original dam was designed to store 142 million m3. The high sediment yield of the Sundays River meant that sediment delivery into the reservoir basin quickly reduced its capacity. The dam wall was raised by 1.5 m in 1935 and again by 5.8 m (total capacity 327,628,072 m3) in 1951/52 to cope with the loss of storage volume.  The rebuilt dam was opened on 26 April 1952, by the then Minister of Land and Irrigation, J. G. Strydom, with work supervised by the Sundays River Irrigation Board, with J. Kevin Murphy as the consulting engineer. By 1979 the reservoir had lost 41.47% of its design capacity, with ~135,870,000 m3 of sediment captured behind the wall. 

Its primary purpose is for irrigation, industrial and domestic use.

The serious drought of 1966 and 1967 emphasized the necessity to commence work on the Skoenmakers Canal (capacity: 22 m3/s) to link the Great Fish River to Darlington Dam as soon as possible. In view of an expected increase in irrigation below Darlington Dam and the demand for water in the Port Elizabeth metropolitan area, it was decided to replace the Wellington Grove pumping station with De Mistkraal Weir upstream of Wellington Grove and a short section of connecting canal to the beginning of the Skoenmakers Canal.

See also
 List of reservoirs and dams in South Africa
 List of rivers of South Africa

References 

 List of South African Dams from the Department of Water Affairs and Forestry (South Africa)

Dams in South Africa
Dams completed in 1922